Smokin' Taters! is an album by the Kentucky-based cowpunk band Nine Pound Hammer. It was released in 1992. The band supported the album with a European tour.

Some demos were recorded in Glasgow in 1990. "Long Gone Daddy" is a cover of the Hank Williams song.

Critical reception
Trouser Press wrote that the album "smokes out of the speakers with redoubled purpose and fluid, road-tested rockabilly punk."

Track listing
 Long Gone Daddy
 Cadillac Inn
 Everything You Know Is Wrong
 Feelin' Kinda Froggy
 Don't Get No
 Folsom Prison Blues
 Turned Traitor For A Piece Of Tail
 I'm On Fire
 Wrong Side Of The Road
 Head Bangin' Stock Boy
 Surfabilly
 Weasel, The

Personnel
Blaine Cartwright - Guitar
Rob Hulsman - Drums
Matt Bartholomy - Bass
Scott Luallen - Vocals
Bill & Michelle - Backing Vocals
Michael Mariconda - Producer
Albert Caiati - Engineer

References

External links 
 Discogs

Nine Pound Hammer albums
1992 albums
Crypt Records albums

ru:Smokin’ Taters!